South African Red Cross Air Mercy Service also known as AMS is an air ambulance service headquartered at Cape Town International Airport with various bases in South Africa.

Bases 

The SA Red Cross Air Mercy Service has bases at the following locations:
Cape Town - Cape Town International Airport 
Oudtshoorn - Oudtshoorn Airport
Durban - King Shaka International Airport 
Richards Bay - Richards Bay Airport 
Polokwane - Polokwane International Airport

History 

The SA Red Cross Air Ambulance Service was started in 1966 with a single Cessna 205 aircraft to provide a service for the transportation of critically ill and injured persons from the remote areas of South Africa.

In 1971 the service acquired an additional aircraft, a Piper Aztec, nicknamed the "Spirit of Rotary I". The funding or this aircraft was achieved through the assistance of the Rotary Club. In November 1982 the "Spirit of Rotary II", a Piper Chieftain took off from the then called DF Malan Airport in Cape Town. 1988 the service acquired its first jet aircraft, a Cessna Citation II.

In 1994 a trust was formed and the organization changed its name to the present South African Red Cross Air Mercy Service Trust.

Fleet 

The South African Red Cross Air Mercy Service fleet comprises the following fixed and rotorwing aircraft:

References

External links 
SA Red Cross Air Mercy Service

Airlines of South Africa
Air ambulance services in Africa
Emergency medical services in South Africa
Medical and health organisations based in South Africa
1966 establishments in South Africa
Organisations based in South Africa
Charities based in South Africa
International Red Cross and Red Crescent Movement